The Antennae Galaxies (also known as NGC 4038/NGC 4039 or Caldwell 60/Caldwell 61) are a pair of interacting galaxies in the constellation Corvus. They are currently going through a starburst phase, in which the collision of clouds of gas and dust, with entangled magnetic fields, causes rapid star formation. They were discovered by William Herschel in 1785.

General information

The Antennae Galaxies are undergoing a galactic collision. Located in the NGC 4038 group with five other galaxies, these two galaxies are known as the Antennae Galaxies because the two long tails of stars, gas and dust ejected from the galaxies as a result of the collision resemble an insect's antennae. 

The nuclei of the two galaxies are joining to become one giant galaxy. Most galaxies probably undergo at least one significant collision in their lifetimes. This is likely the future of our Milky Way when it collides with the Andromeda Galaxy. This collision and merger sequence (the Toomre sequence) for galaxy evolution was developed in part by successfully modeling the Antennae Galaxies' "antennae" in particular.

Five supernovae have been discovered in NGC 4038: SN 1921A, SN 1974E, SN 2004GT, SN 2007sr and SN 2013dk.

A recent study finds that these interacting galaxies are less remote from the Milky Way than previously thought—at 45 million light-years instead of 65 million light-years.

They are located 0.25° north of 31 Crateris and 3.25° southwest of Gamma Corvi.

The Antennae galaxies also contain a relatively young collection of massive globular clusters that were possibly formed as a result of the collision between the two galaxies. The young age of these clusters is in contrast to the average age of most known globular clusters (which are around 12 billion years old), with the formation of the globulars likely originating from shockwaves, generated by the collision of the galaxies, compressing large, massive molecular clouds. The densest regions of the collapsing and compressing clouds are believed to be the birthplace of the clusters.

Timeline

About 1.2 billion years ago, the Antennae were two separate galaxies. NGC 4038 was a barred spiral galaxy and NGC 4039 was a spiral galaxy. 900 million years ago, the Antennae began to approach one another, looking similar to NGC 2207 and IC 2163. 600 million years ago, the Antennae passed through each other, looking like the Mice Galaxies. 300 million years ago, the Antennae's stars began to be released from both galaxies. Today the two streamers of ejected stars extend far beyond the original galaxies, resulting in the antennae shape.

Within 400 million years, the Antennae's nuclei will collide and become a single core with stars, gas, and dust around it. Observations and simulations of colliding galaxies (e.g., by Alar Toomre) suggest that the Antennae Galaxies will eventually form an elliptical galaxy.

X-ray source
Areas containing large amounts of neon, magnesium, and silicon were found when the Chandra X-ray Observatory analyzed the Antennae Galaxies. Heavy elements such as these are necessary in order for planets that may contain life (as we know it) to form. The clouds imaged contain 16 times as much magnesium and 24 times as much silicon as the Sun.

See also
Whirlpool Galaxy
List of largest galaxies

References

Notes

External links

Astronomy Picture of the Day: The Antennae Galaxies (10/22/1997)
Astronomy Picture of the Day: The Antennae (05/07/2010)
Astronomy Picture of the Day: The Antennae (04/29/2011)
Astronomy Picture of the Day: The Antennae (02/12/2015)
The Register: Galactic prang fingered in star formation mystery
ESA/Hubble News Release
ESA/Hubble images of Antennae Galaxies
Animations of galactic collision producing antennae structures

Antennae Galaxies at Constellation Guide

Barred spiral galaxies
Unbarred spiral galaxies
Peculiar galaxies
Interacting galaxies
NGC 4038 Group
Corvus (constellation)
NGC objects
037967
244
060b
Astronomical objects discovered in 1785
UGCA objects